Calpurnia is a genus of flowering plants within the family Fabaceae. The genus comprises shrubs or small trees in or along the margin of forests in the eastern parts of South Africa. They shed leaves in winter unless in moist areas, where they are evergreen. They make good garden plants because they are easily raised from seed, flower at two years and withstand frost.

The species Calpurnia aurea is also known as Wild Laburnum or Wildegeelkeur (in Afrikaans). The bright yellow flowers have the typical form of the Fabaceae (pea family). They are borne in racemes and flowering can take place over several months. The flowers are visited by carpenter bees, after which the pollinated flowers turn into thin, straw-colored pods.

Species
Calpurnia comprises the following species:

 Calpurnia aurea (Aiton) Benth.
 subsp. aurea (Aiton) Benth.
 subsp. indica Brummitt
 Calpurnia capensis (Burm. f.) Druce

 Calpurnia glabrata Brummitt

 Calpurnia robinioides (DC.) E. Mey.
 Calpurnia sericea Harv.

 Calpurnia villosa Harv.
 Calpurnia woodii Schinz

References

Flora of South Africa
Podalyrieae
Fabaceae genera